The System of the World is a novel by Neal Stephenson and is the third and final volume in The Baroque Cycle.  The title alludes to the third volume of Isaac Newton's Philosophiae Naturalis Principia Mathematica, which bears the same name.

The System of the World won the Locus Award for Best Science Fiction Novel and the Prometheus Award in 2005, as well as a receiving a nomination for the Arthur C. Clarke Award the same year.

Plot

Solomon's Gold

Daniel Waterhouse returns to England from his "Technologickal College" project in Boston in order to try to resolve the feud between Isaac Newton and Gottfried Leibniz over who invented calculus. Someone attempts to assassinate him with an "Infernal Device" (a time bomb), and Waterhouse forms a club to find out who did it and prosecute them. It later turns out that the bomb was intended for his friend Isaac Newton.

Jack Shaftoe, under the alias Jack the Coiner, attempts a heist at the Tower of London.

Currency

Daniel Waterhouse and Isaac attempt to track down Jack Shaftoe for his counterfeiting crimes and tampering with the Pyx. Meanwhile Eliza aids Princess Caroline of the Hanovers as her life is threatened amid the scheming over the successor to Queen Anne. Warring militias gather in London and the Whigs and Tories face off.

The System of the World

Newton dies of typhus (then known as gaol fever) immediately prior to the Trial of the Pyx, but is brought back to life with the philosopher's stone. Jack eventually confesses to his counterfeiting crimes and is hanged but the watching crowd intervene and he survives, unknown to Newton. Jack is reunited with his love Eliza, and they live out their days in the court of Louis XIV.

Style
The System of the World emulates many different literary styles. As one reviewer put it: it "is a con-fusion ... of historical novel, roman à thèse, epistolary novel, roman à clef, nouveau roman, satirical novel, roman fleuve, et cetera, et cetera, all bound up in the unlikely guise of epic science-fiction page-turner."

Main characters
Eliza
Enoch Root
Bob Shaftoe, brother of Jack Shaftoe
Jack Shaftoe
Daniel Waterhouse
Isaac Newton
Johann von Hacklheber

Other characters
Henry Arlanc, Huguenot, friend of Jack Shaftoe, porter at the Royal Society
Mrs. Arlanc, wife of Henry
Roger Comstock, Marquis of Ravenscar, Whig ally of Daniel Waterhouse
Will Comstock, Earl of Lostwithiel
Édouard de Gex, Jesuit fanatic
William Ham, Banker, nephew of Daniel Waterhouse
Otto van Hoek, Captain of the Minerva
Dappa, First mate of the Minerva
Mr. Kikin, Russian diplomat in London
Norman Orney, London shipbuilder
Mr. Threader, Tory money-scrivener
Charles White, fictional, Tory who bites off people's ears
Peter Hoxton (alias Saturn), Horologist, engages in illicit activities

Historical figures who appear as characters in the novel
Catherine Barton
Caroline of Ansbach
John Churchill, 1st Duke of Marlborough
George I of Great Britain
George II of Great Britain
Robert Harley, 1st Earl of Oxford and Earl Mortimer
Jack Ketch
Gottfried Leibniz
Thomas Newcomen
Isaac Newton
Peter the Great
Sophia of Hanover
Henry St John, 1st Viscount Bolingbroke
Christopher Wren

References

Editions
  : Hardcover edition.
  : Paperback edition.

External links
 The System of the World at Worlds Without End

2004 American novels
Novels by Neal Stephenson
2004 science fiction novels
American science fiction novels
The Baroque Cycle
William Morrow and Company books